Michael Sadler may refer to:

 Michael Thomas Sadler (1780–1835), radical British Tory Member of Parliament
 Michael Sadler (educationist) (1861–1943), British historian, educationalist and university administrator
 Michael Sadler, Welsh-born musician, best known for his work with the band Saga

See also
 Michael Sadleir (1888–1957), British publisher, novelist, book collector and bibliographer, born Sadler